In 638, the Armenian Apostolic Church began appointing its own bishop in Jerusalem, generally known as the Armenian Patriarch of Jerusalem. The office has continued, with some interruptions, down to this day. 

The bishop at the Armenian Patriarchate of Jerusalem is given the title of Patriarch in deference to Jerusalem's holy status within Christianity and has an independent jurisdiction from the Catholicos of Armenia and of All Armenians. The Patriarch's title is "His Beatitude".

Armenian Patriarchs of Jerusalem
 Abraham I (638–669) -- Աբրահամ Ա.
 Krikor I Yetesattzi (669–696) -- Գրիգոր Ա. Եդեսացի
 Kevork (696–708) -- Գէորգ
 Mgrdich (708–730) -- Մկրտիչ
 Hovhannes I (730–758) -- Յովհաննէս Ա.
 Stepanos (758–774) -- Ստեփանոս 
 Yeghia (774–797) -- Եղիա
 unknown
 Abraham II (885–909) -- Աբրահամ Բ. 
 unknown
 Krikor II (981–1006) -- Գրիգոր Բ.
 Arsen (1006–1008) -- Արսէն
 Mesrob (1008) -- Մեսրոպ
 Arsen (1008–1038), restored -- Արսէն
 unknown
 Simeon I (1090–1109) -- Սիմէոն Ա.
 Movses (1109–1133) -- Մովսէս
 Esayee I (1133–1152) -- Եսայի Ա.
 Sahag (1152–1180) -- Սահակ
 Abraham III (1180–1191) -- Աբրահամ Գ.
 Minas (1191–1205) -- Մինաս
 Abraham IV (1215–1218) -- Աբրահամ Դ.
 Arakel (1218–1230) -- Արաքել
 Hovhannes II (1230–1238) -- Յովհաննէս Բ.
 Garabed I (1238–1254) -- Կարապետ Ա.
 Hagopos (1254–1281) -- Յակոբոս
 Sarkis I (1281–1313) -- Սարգիս Ա.
 Theodore I (1313–1316) -- Թէոդորոս Ա.
 David (1316–1321) -- Դավիթ
 Boghos (1321–1323) -- Պօղոս
 Vartan Areveltzi (1323–1332) -- Վարդան Արեւելցի
 Hovhannes III (1332–1341) -- Յովհաննէս Գ.
 Parsegh (1341–1356) -- Բարսեղ 
 Krikor III (1356–1363) -- Գրիգոր Գ.
 Giragos (coadjutor) -- Կիրակոս
 Mgrdich (1363–1378) -- Մկրտիչ 
 Hovhannes IV Lehatzee (1378–1386) -- Յովհաննէս Դ. Լեհացի 
 Krikor IV of Egypt (1386–1391) -- Գրիգոր Դ. Եգիպտացի
 Esayee II (1391–1394) -- Եսայի Բ.
 Sarkis II (1394–1415) -- Սարգիս Բ.
 Mardiros (coadjutor) (1399) -- Մարտիրոս
 Mesrob (coadjutor) (1402) -- Մեսրոպ
 Boghos Karnetzi (1415–1419) -- Պօղոս Կարնեցի
 Mardiros of Egypt (1419–1430) -- Մարտիրոս Եգիպտացի
 Minas (coadjutor) (1426) -- Մինաս 
 Esayee III (1430–1431) -- Եսայի Գ.
 Hovhannes IV (1431–1441) -- Յովհաննէս Դ.
 Abraham V Missirtzee (1441–1454) -- Աբրահամ Ե. Միսիրցի 
 Mesrob (1454–1461) -- Մեսրոպ
 Bedros (1461–1476) -- Պետրոս
 Mgrdich Elovtzee (1476–1479) -- Մկրտիչ Ելովցի
 Abraham VI Pereeahtzee (1479–1485) -- Աբրահամ Զ. Բերիացի
 Hovhannes V Missirtzee (1485–1491) -- Յովհաննէս Ե. Միսիրցի
 Mardiros Broosatzee (1491–1501) -- Մարտիրոս Բրուսացի
 Bedros (1501–1507) -- Պետրոս
 Sarkis III (1507–1517) -- Սարգիս Գ.
 Hovhannes VI (1517–1522) -- Յովհաննէս Զ.
 Theodore II of Jerusalem (Asdvadzadoor Merdeentzee) (1532–1542) -- Թէոդորոս Բ. (Աստուածատուր Մերտինցի)
 Pilibos (1542–1550) -- Փիլիպոս
 Theodore (Asdvadzadoor Merdeentzee) (1550–1551), restored -- Թէոդորոս (Աստուածատուր Մերտինցի)
 Antreas Merdeentzee (1551–1583) -- Անդրէաս Մերտինցի
 David Merdeentzee (1583–1613) -- Դաւիթ Մերտինցի
 Krikor V Kantzagehtzee (1613–1645) -- Գրիգոր Ե. Գանձակեցի
 Theodore III of Jerusalem (Asdvadzadoor Daronetzee) (1645–1664) -- Թէոդորոս Գ. (Աստուածատուր Տարօնցի)
 Yeghiazar Hromglayetzee (coadjutor) (1664–1665) -- Եղիազար Հռոմկլայեցի
 Theodore III of Jerusalem (Asdvadzadoor Daronetzee) (1665–1666), restored -- Թէոդորոս Գ. (Աստուածատուր Տարօնցի)
 Yeghiazar Hromglayetzee (1666–1668), restored -- Եղիազար Հռոմկլայեցի
 Theodore III of Jerusalem (Asdvadzadoor Daronetzee) (1668–1670), restored -- Թէոդորոս Գ. (Աստուածատուր Տարօնցի) 
 Yeghiazar Hromglayetzee (1670–1677), restored -- Եղիազար Հռոմկլայեցի
 Martiros of Crimea (1677–1680) -- Մարտիրոս Ղրիմեցի
 Hovhannes VII Amasyatzee (1680) -- Յովհաննէս Է. Ամասիացի
 Mardiros Khrimtzi (1681–1683), restored -- Մարտիրոս Ղրիմեցի
 Locum Tenens (1683–1684) 
 Hovhannes VIII Bolsetzi (1684–1697) -- Յովհաննէս Ը. Պոլսեցի 
 Simeon II (1688–1691) -- Սիմէոն Բ.
 vacant (1691–1696)
 Minas Hamtetzi (1697–1704) -- Մինաս Համդեցի
 Kaloosd Hetoontzi (coadjutor) -- Գալուստ Հեթունցի
 Krikor (coadjutor) (1704–1715), also Armenian Patriarch of Constantinople—Գրիգոր 
 Krikor VI Shiravantzee (Chainbearer) (1715–1749) -- Գրիգոր Զ. Շիրաւանցի (Շղթայակիր)
 Hagop Nalian (1749–1752) -- Յակոբ Նալեան 
 Teotoros IV (1752–1761) -- Թէոդորոս Դ.
 Garabed II Tantchagetzee (1761–1768) -- Կարապետ Բ.
 Boghos Vanetzee (1768–1775) -- Պօղոս Վանեցի 
 Hovhannes IX Kanapertzee (1775–1793) -- Յովհաննէս Թ.
 Bedros Yevtogeeyatzee (1793–1800) -- Պետրոս Եւդովկիացի
 Teodoros V Vanetzi (1800–1818) -- Թէոդորոս Ե. Վանեցի
 Kapriel Neegomeetatzee (1818–1840) -- Գաբրիէլ Նիկոմիտացի
 Zakaria Gopetzi (1840–1846) -- Զաքարիա
 Giragos (1846–1850) -- Կիրակոս
 Hovhannes X of Smyrna (1850–1860) -- Յովհաննէս Ժ. Զմիւռնացի
 Vrtanes (1860–1864) -- Locum Tenens— Վրթանէս
 Esayee IV of Talas (1864–1885; also Esayi, Issay, Yessai, Yessay or Yessayi Garabedian) -- Եսայի Դ.
 Yeremya Der Sahagian (1885–1889) -- Locum Tenens for Harootiun Vehabedian until the latter's arrival—Երեմիա Տէր Սահակեան
 Harootiun Vehabedian (1889–1910) -- elected 1885 but stayed in Istanbul until 1889 -- Յարութիւն Վեհապետեան
 vacant (1910–1921)
 Yeghishe Tourian (1921–1929) -- Եղիշէ Դուրեան
 Torkom Koushagian (1931–1939) -- Թորգոմ Գուշակեան
 Mesrob Nishanian (1939–1944) -- Մեսրոպ Նշանեան
 Guregh Israelian (1944–1949) -- Կիւրեղ Իսրայէլեան
 vacant (1949–1957)
 Tiran Nersoyan (1957–1958) -- elected but never consecrated—Տիրան Ներսոյեան
 vacant (1958–1960)
 Yeghishe Derderian (1960–1990) -- Եղիշէ Տէրտէրեան
 Torkom Manoogian (1990–2012) -- Թորգոմ Մանուկեան
 Nourhan Manougian (2013–present) -- Նուրհան Մանուկեան

See also
 List of Catholicoi of Armenia
 List of Armenian Catholicoi of Cilicia
 List of Armenian Catholic Patriarchs of Cilicia
 List of Armenian Patriarchs of Constantinople
 Pro-Jerusalem Society (1918-1926) - the Patriarch was a member of its leading Council

External links
 The Armenian Patriarchate website

Religion-related lists
Lists of patriarchs

Lists of Oriental Orthodox Christians
Christianity in Jerusalem
Patriarchs Of Jerusalem
Armenian Patriarchs